Renala Khurd Hydropower Plant (RKHPP), also known as Ganga Ram Powerhouse, and Zaheer-ud-Din Babar Powerhouse, is a small, low-head, run-of-the-river hydroelectric generation station with a  capacity, located at Renala Khurd, Okara District, North-East of Punjab province of Pakistan, on the flows of Lower Bari Doab Canal. Having five turbine units, each rated for  production capacity, this plant was set up to meet the electricity needs of the Mitchells Fruit Farms and Food Processing.

History
Sir Ganga Ram (1851–1927), a civil engineer and leading philanthropist of his time, established Renala Hydral Power Station in 1925, Pakistan's (Indian subcontinent's) first hydropower station.
Sir Ganga Ram, engineer and philanthropist, born in 1851 in Mangtanwala, a small village of Punjab province in British India, now in Punjab, Pakistan, were leading philanthropist and agriculturist of his time and established the Renala hydropower station in Renala Khurd, Punjab, in 1925.

See also 

 List of dams and reservoirs in Pakistan
 List of power stations in Pakistan
 Satpara Dam
 Allai Khwar Hydropower Project
 Gomal Zam Dam

References

Dams completed in 1925
Energy infrastructure completed in 1925
Dams in Pakistan
Hydroelectric power stations in Pakistan
Run-of-the-river power stations
Energy in Punjab, Pakistan